Corrosion under insulation (CUI) is a severe form of localized external corrosion that occurs in carbon and low alloy steel equipment that has been insulated.  This form of corrosion occurs when water is absorbed by or collected in the insulation.  The equipment begins to corrode as it is exposed to water and oxygen. CUI is common in refineries and process plants that typically operate equipment at high temperatures.
Corrosion is at its worst where thermal cycling occurs. In this instance the moist condenses back on to the core material until it is flashed off when the plant is brought back into operation.

References

External links 
 99 Diseases of Pressure Equipment: Corrosion Under Insulation (CUI) — Inspectioneering Journal

Corrosion